Stephen Herbert Fuller (February 4, 1920 - January 24, 2005) was an American academic and businessman. He was the Jaime and Josefina Chua Tiampo Professor of Business Administration at the Harvard Business School, and its associate dean from 1963 to 1969. He was the founding president of the Asian Institute of Management in the Philippines. He was the Vice-President of Personnel of General Motors from 1971 to 1982. He was also the chairman and chief executive officer of World Book Encyclopedia.

Early life
Stephen H. Fuller was born on February 4, 1920, in Athens, Ohio. He was educated at the Athens High School. He graduated from Ohio University in 1941, where he also won the Award of Merit. He earned a master in business administration from the Harvard Business School in 1947, followed by a Doctorate of Commercial Science.

Career
Fuller became a professor at his alma mater, the Harvard Business School, in 1952. He taught classes about organizational behavior and collective bargaining. He was the Associate Dean from 1963 to 1969. He retired as the Jaime and Josefina Chua Tiampo Professor of Business Administration emeritus at the Harvard Business School.

Fuller was the founding president of the Asian Institute of Management in Makati, the Philippines.

Fuller was the Vice-President of Personnel of General Motors from 1971 to 1982. In this capacity, he was in charge of improving productivity and motivation among workers. In 1981, he announced layoffs based on performance.

Fuller was also the chairman and chief executive officer of World Book Encyclopedia. In 1989, he moved their offices to suburban Chicago, namely Evanston and Elk Grove Village to cut down operating costs.

Personal life, death and legacy
Fuller married Frances Mulhearn. They had four children: Mark B. Fuller; Joseph B. Fuller; Teofilo Fuller; and Roger Palaganas. His sons Joseph and Mark co-founder the Monitor Group, a consulting firm now known as Monitor Deloitte. Joseph is also a professor at the Harvard Business School.

Fuller died on January 24, 2005, in Belmont, Massachusetts, at the age of 84. He was buried at the Mount Auburn Cemetery.

Fuller and his widow are the namesakes of The Frances M. and Stephen H. Fuller Visiting Professorship in Southeast Asian Studies at Ohio University.

Works

References

1920 births
2005 deaths
People from Athens, Ohio
Ohio University alumni
Harvard Business School alumni
Harvard Business School faculty
General Motors former executives
American expatriates in the Philippines